Sangam is a 1997 Pakistani romantic feature film, directed by Syed Noor and starring Resham, Shaan, Saleem Sheikh and Sana. It was a comeback movie for Shaan, and the film debut of actress Sana.

Plot
The plot tells the story of a patient who is bound to live in a glass-made room for all his life, but whose fate changes when he falls in love with a female pop-singer, Resham, for whom he breaks his glass-house, putting his life in danger, as he cannot breathe natural air.

Cast
Resham as Resham
Shaan as Jaan
Saleem Sheikh as Sonny
Sana as Dr. Sana

Awards
This film won 4 Nigar Awards in 1997:
Nigar Award for Best Actor Shaan
Nigar Award for Best Supporting Actress Sana
Nigar Award for Best Song Writer Rukhsana Noor
Nigar Award for Best Female Singer Humaira Channa

References

External links

1990s Urdu-language films
Pakistani romantic drama films
1997 films
Films directed by Syed Noor
Films scored by Amjad Bobby
Nigar Award winners
Urdu-language Pakistani films